The 2021–22 Florida A&M Rattlers basketball team represented Florida A&M University in the 2021–22 NCAA Division I men's basketball season. The Rattlers, led by fifth-year head coach Robert McCullum, played their home games at the Al Lawson Center in Tallahassee, Florida as members of the Southwestern Athletic Conference.

Previous season
In a season limited due to the ongoing COVID-19 pandemic, the Rattlers finished the 2020–21 season 8–12, 7–5 in MEAC play to finish in second place in the Southern Division. In the MEAC tournament, they were defeated by Morgan State in the quarterfinals.

On July 1, 2021, the Rattlers officially returned to the SWAC after being a member of the Mid-Eastern Athletic Conference since 1986.

Roster

Schedule and results

|-
!colspan=12 style=| Non-conference regular season

|-
!colspan=12 style=| SWAC regular season

|-
!colspan=9 style=| SWAC tournament

Sources

References

Florida A&M Rattlers basketball seasons
Florida AandM Rattlers
Florida AandM Rattlers basketball
Florida AandM Rattlers basketball